Knut Magne Flølo  (born 18 November 1949) is a Norwegian politician.

He was elected deputy representative to the Storting for the period 2017–2021 for the Progress Party. He replaced Jon Georg Dale at the Storting from October 2017. He has served as mayor of Vestnes.

References

1949 births
Living people
People from Vestnes
Progress Party (Norway) politicians
Mayors of places in Møre og Romsdal
Members of the Storting